Església de Sant Pere del Tarter  is a church located in El Tarter, Canillo Parish, Andorra. It is a heritage property registered in the Cultural Heritage of Andorra. It was built in the 16th century.

References

Canillo
Roman Catholic churches in Andorra
Cultural Heritage of Andorra